Pimelimyia is a genus of parasitic flies in the family Tachinidae. There are about five described species in Pimelimyia.

Species
These five species belong to the genus Pimelimyia:
 Pimelimyia grossa Mesnil, 1959
 Pimelimyia insularis (Villeneuve, 1915)
 Pimelimyia rufina (Curran, 1927)
 Pimelimyia russata (Villeneuve, 1943)
 Pimelimyia semitestacea (Villeneuve, 1916)

References

Further reading

 
 
 
 

Tachinidae
Monotypic Brachycera genera
Articles created by Qbugbot